Goldsborough Serpell Patrick (26 April 1907 – 21 March 1999) was a rear admiral in the United States Navy.

Biography
Patrick was born Goldsborough Serpell Patrick on Goat Island in San Francisco, California. He was the son of Jane Deakins Serpell of Norfolk, Virginia, and Navy Chaplain Capt Bower Reynolds Patrick. He died 21 March 1999 in Virginia Beach, Virginia.

Career

On December 7, 1941, Patrick was stationed at Pearl Harbor. During the attack that day, his directive that moored ships store live ammunition in their gun mounts would help the U.S. resistance against the Imperial Japanese Navy. He later commanded the destroyer  during World War II from commissioning on 20 March 1944 until 20 September 1945 and participated in the Battles of Leyte Gulf, Iwo Jima and Okinawa.

Later, Patrick would command the battleship  during the Korean War. Following the war, he was named Chief of the Military Assistance Advisory Group in the Netherlands and Inspector General of the Navy.

Awards he received include the Navy Cross, Bronze Star Medal with award star and the Legion of Merit.

References

1907 births
1999 deaths
United States Navy admirals
Recipients of the Navy Cross (United States)
United States Navy personnel of World War II
United States Navy personnel of the Korean War
People from San Francisco
United States Navy Inspectors General
Military personnel from California